James MacDonald Hastie (born 17 August 1949) is a Scottish former amateur footballer who played as a right back in the Scottish League for Queen's Park. He was capped by Scotland at amateur level and later served as president of Queen's Park.

References 

Scottish footballers
Scottish Football League players
Queen's Park F.C. players
Association football fullbacks
Scotland amateur international footballers
1949 births
Sportspeople from Dumbarton
Footballers from West Dunbartonshire
Living people
Glasgow University F.C. players